Mahdi Yovari (born 9 June 1997) is an Afghan sports shooter. He competed in the men's 10 metre air rifle event at the 2020 Summer Olympics, marking the nation's Olympic debut in the sport. Yovari finished 47th in the qualification round.

Early life and career 
Yovari was born in Afghanistan and raised in Iran by his mother. After leaving Afghanistan at the age of 17, he sought asylum in various countries. In 2017, he left his family as a teenager and settled in Nyon, Switzerland. From 2019, he was trained by Italian shooter Niccolo Campriani as part of Campriani's Make A Mark project. Mahdi used Campriani's rifle and tripod. In 2020, he was part of the Olympic Channel's documentary series 'Taking Refuge'.

References 

1997 births
Living people
Afghan male sport shooters
Olympic shooters of Afghanistan
Shooters at the 2020 Summer Olympics
Afghan expatriates in Iran
Afghan expatriates in Switzerland